The Tour Championship is an annual golf tournament that is part of the PGA Tour.

Tour Championship may also refer to:

Bowling
 PWBA Tour Championship, in bowling

Golf

Asia
 Japan Golf Tour Championship
 Japan LPGA Tour Championship
 KPGA Tour Championship, in Korea, defunct since 2018

Europe
 Challenge Tour Championship, in Europe, defunct since 2002
 ECCO Tour Championship, in Denmark, defunct since 2012
 MCB Tour Championship, part of the European Senior Tour
 Seniors Tour Championship, in Europe, contested 2000–2010

United States
 CME Group Tour Championship, current season-ending event of the LPGA Tour
 Epson Tour Championship, part of the LPGA's developmental tour
 Korn Ferry Tour Championship, season-ending tournament of the Korn Ferry Tour
 LPGA Tour Championship, contested in 2009 and 2010, replaced by the CME Group Tour Championship
 Senior Tour Championship, now known as the Charles Schwab Cup Championship

Elsewhere
 ANZ Tour Championship, in Australia, defunct since 2004
 The Tour Championship (Sunshine Tour), established in 2018 in South Africa
 Sunshine Tour Championship, contested 2001–2010 in South Africa
 Tour Championship of Canada, established 2002

Snooker
 Tour Championship, established in Wales in 2019
 Players Tour Championship, now defunct

Tennis
 WTA Tour Championship, in tennis, now known as the WTA Finals
 ATP Tour Championship Tennis, a video game released in 1994

See also
 The Championship Tour, a 2018 rap tour in North America
 Nestea European Championship Tour, in beach volleyball